The Astro Tower is a skyscraper in Brussels, Belgium. It is located on the north-eastern corner of the Small Ring (Brussels' inner ring road) in the municipality of Saint-Josse-ten-Noode, just north of the Madou Plaza Tower.

The financial firm Fortis leased the entirety of the building from 2005 to 2011. From 2011 to 2013, the building underwent extensive renovations. The owner, HPG Belgium NV, sold the Astro Tower to Spanish investor Luresa in February 2008.

Gallery

See also

 Finance Tower
 North Galaxy Towers
 Madou Plaza Tower
 Proximus Towers
 Rogier Tower
 World Trade Center (Brussels)

References

Buildings and structures in Brussels
Skyscraper office buildings in Belgium
Saint-Josse-ten-Noode

Office buildings completed in 1976